Catherine Bach (born Catherine Bachman; March 1, 1954) is an American actress. She is known for playing Daisy Duke in the television series The Dukes of Hazzard and Margo Dutton in African Skies. In 2012, she joined the cast of the CBS soap opera The Young and the Restless as Anita Lawson.

Early life 
Bach was born in Cleveland, Ohio, the daughter of Norma Jean Kucera (née Verdugo), an acupuncturist, and Bernard P. Bachman, a rancher. Her mother was a daughter of Antonio L. Verdugo, of Bisbee, Arizona, a baker born in Mexico, while her father was of German ancestry. She was raised in  Warren, Ohio. Her mother, born into the Verdugo family, claimed to be descended from one of California's earliest landed families. 

She spent some of her childhood on a ranch in South Dakota,  and she visited her grandparents in Faith, South Dakota. In 1970, Bach graduated from 
Stevens High School in Rapid City, South Dakota. She briefly majored in drama at UCLA, where she supplemented her income by making clothes for friends and theater groups.

Career
Bach's professional debut was as one of the children in a production of The Sound of Music. Bach's first screen appearance was in the Burt Lancaster murder mystery, The Midnight Man, shot in upstate South Carolina in 1973, in which she played the murdered coed, Natalie Claiburn. Her next role was Melody in the 1974 film Thunderbolt and Lightfoot.

Bach heard about the audition for The Dukes of Hazzard through her husband. When she arrived there, she found the producers were looking for a Dolly Parton-lookalike; despite not looking like what they were searching for, she was hired on the spot. One of the earliest costume ideas from the producers was that she wear a tight white turtleneck, go-go boots and a poodle skirt, but Bach asked if she could bring her own outfit, which was a homemade T-shirt, a pair of cut-off denim shorts and high heels. Bach had concerns about the appropriateness of the cut-off shorts at first, saying she could not wear them in a restaurant scene. When prompted by the producers to visit a restaurant across the street, Bach found the waitresses were wearing "little miniskirts that matched the tablecloths!". This style of cut-off denim shorts are now popularly known as "Daisy Dukes" in reference to Bach's character of that name from the show. She starred on The Dukes of Hazzard opposite Tom Wopat, John Schneider and James Best.

At the suggestion of the show's producers, Bach posed as Daisy Duke for a poster, which sold 5 million copies. The poster once caused a stir when Nancy Reagan took a liking to it after Bach visited the White House with one as a gift for one of her former schoolteachers then working there.

While she was starring on The Dukes of Hazzard, her legs were insured for $1,000,000. In 1985, she served as the model for the figurehead for the schooner Californian.

After the series ended, Bach had roles in a number of low-profile films. From 1992 to 1994, she starred in the Canadian family drama series, African Skies. In 2006, she guest-starred on Monk, and in 2010 had a small cameo in the comedy film You Again. In 2012, Bach joined the cast of CBS daytime soap opera, The Young and the Restless in the recurring role of Anita Lawson.

In 2002, Bach launched a line of diamond jewelry at Debenhams.

Personal life
Bach married David Shaw (stepson of Angela Lansbury) in 1976; the couple divorced in 1981. Bach married entertainment lawyer Peter Lopez in August 1990. They had two daughters. On April 30, 2010, 60-year-old Lopez was found shot dead in an apparent suicide.

Bach is Catholic.

Filmography

Film

Television

References

External links

1954 births
Living people
20th-century American actresses
21st-century American actresses
Actresses from Cleveland
Actresses from South Dakota
American film actresses
American television actresses
People from Rapid City, South Dakota
American actresses of Mexican descent
American soap opera actresses
UCLA Film School alumni
Catholics from Ohio
Catholics from South Dakota